Nicole Esther Rodríguez Ayala (born 29 August 1992) is an American-born Puerto Rican footballer who plays as a midfielder for the Puerto Rico women's national team.

Early life
Rodríguez was raised in Avon, Connecticut. Her parents are from Puerto Rico.

International goals
Scores and results list Puerto Rico's goal tally first.

References

1992 births
Living people
Women's association football midfielders
Puerto Rican women's footballers
Puerto Rico women's international footballers
Kansallinen Liiga players
FC Honka (women) players
Puerto Rican expatriate women's footballers
Puerto Rican expatriate sportspeople in Finland
Expatriate women's footballers in Finland
Puerto Rican expatriates in England
Expatriate women's footballers in England
American women's soccer players
Soccer players from Connecticut
Sportspeople from Hartford County, Connecticut
People from Avon, Connecticut
American sportspeople of Puerto Rican descent
Notre Dame Fighting Irish women's soccer players
American expatriate women's soccer players
American expatriate sportspeople in Finland
American expatriate sportspeople in England